True Monster Stories, written by Terry Deary, is the first of the non-fiction True Stories Series of books.  It was published in 1992 by Hippo Books from Scholastic.

Overview
The book details strange but apparently "true" encounters with a variety of monsters.  The book is divided into eight sections; ranging from wild-men, to bigfoot/sasquatch, through to sea creatures (including Loch Ness Monster), vampires and werewolves.

Each section opens with an introduction into that particular set of monsters/creatures.  Accounts and brief details then follow of supposed encounters, and each account then ends with a fact file.  These fact files present a brief analysis of the events in the accounts, and then present miscellaneous related facts from other similar events.

The book is written so as to let the reader decide for themselves whether they believe the events therein to be true or not.

Audience
As with all the True Stores books, it was aimed at an 11+ market, but found popularity with adults and youngsters alike.

See also

 Paranormal

Notes

Children's non-fiction books
1992 children's books
British children's books
Cryptozoology